Goldthwait is a surname. Notable people with the surname include:

Benjamin Goldthwait, British Army officer
Bobcat Goldthwait (born 1962), American comedian, filmmaker, actor and voice actor
Christopher E. Goldthwait (born 1949), American diplomat
Ezekiel Goldthwait (1710–1782), Influential colonial Bostonian
Jill Goldthwait, American politician

Places
Goldthwait Sea, a sea formed after the last ice age that occupied roughly the area of the Gulf of Saint Lawrence
Mount Goldthwait, a mountain of Ellsworth Land, Antarctica

See also
Goldthwaite (surname)
Goldman